There are at least 52 named trails in Granite County, Montana according to the U.S. Geological Survey, Board of Geographic Names.  A trail is defined as: "Route for passage from one point to another; does not include roads or highways (jeep trail, path, ski trail)."

 Atlantic Cable Ski Trail, el.  
 Bad Finger Ski Trail, el.  
 Berkely Ski Trail, el.  
 Black Pine Ridge Trail Number 6, el.  
 Black Pine Trail, el.  
 Boulder Lakes Trail, el.  
 Butte Cabin Ridge Trail, el.  
 Butte Cabin Ridge Trail, el.  
 Catcha Wave Ski Trail, el.  
 Christmas Park Ski Trail, el.  
 Claimjumper Ski Trail, el.  
 Combination Trail Number 3, el.  
 Eightmile Harvey Ridge Trail, el.  
 Gold Bug Ski Trail, el.  
 Gold Rush Ski Trail, el.  
 Good Finger Ski Trail, el.  
 Grizzly Creek Trail, el.  
 Guns and Roses Ski Trail, el.  
 Haunted Forest Ski Trail, el.  
 Hi Line Trail, el.  
 Hogback Ridge Trail, el.  
 John Long Trail, el.  
 Limelight Ski Trail, el.  
 Little Finger Ski Trail, el.  
 Lower Willow Creek Trail Number Four, el.  
 Lums Run Ski Trail, el.  
 Maloney Trail Number 5, el.  
 Manhattan Ski Trail, el.  
 Maverick Ski Trail, el.  
 Medicine Ridge Ski Trail, el.  
 Mills Road Ski Trail, el.  
 Mother Lode Ski Trail, el.  
 Northern Lights Ski Trail, el.  
 Old Number Seven Ski Trail, el.  
 Otters Hump Trail, el.  
 Platinum Ski Trail, el.  
 Pole Ridge Trail, el.  
 Quigg Peak Trail, el.  
 Ranch Creek Trail, el.  
 Red Lion Ski Trail, el.  
 Sandstone Ridge Trail, el.  
 Sapphire Ski Trail, el.  
 Silver Bow Ski Trail, el.  
 Sluice Box Ski Trail, el.  
 Snaggle Tooth Ski Trail, el.  
 Solomon Ridge Trail, el.  
 Southern Cross Ski Trail, el.  
 Spooky Hollow Ski Trail, el.  
 Tenderfoot Ski Trail, el.  
 Terminator Ski Trail, el.  
 The Pitch Ski Trail, el.  
 Willow Harvey Divide Trail, el.

Further reading

See also
 List of trails of Montana
 Trails of Yellowstone National Park

Notes

Geography of Granite County, Montana
 Granite County
Transportation in Granite County, Montana